is a 1937 novel by Yoshino Genzaburō. It follows a 15-year-old boy named Junichi Honda, nicknamed Koperu, and his uncle as the youth deals with spiritual growth, poverty, and the overall experience as human beings. An anime film inspired by the novel is currently in production by Studio Ghibli and director Hayao Miyazaki.

Background
Yūzō Yamamoto originally wrote the novel as one of the final publications in the serial Nihon Shosan Bunko Bunko. However, he was unable to complete it due to severe illness. Genzaburō Yoshino took over and completed How Do You Live?''' in a book form and published the book in 1937.

After the conclusion of World War II, the book underwent several changes such as vocabulary and was republished in 1945 by Mira-sha Publishers.How Do You Live? is a popular work of literature in classical arts education and is often considered as a part of children's literature.

 Plot 
Junichi Honda is a fifteen-year-old high school student, known by his nickname Koperu, after the astronomer Nicholas Copernicus. He is athletic and academically gifted, and popular at school. Koperu's father, a bank executive, passed away when he was young and he lives with his mother. His uncle (on his mother's side) lives nearby and visits frequently. Koperu and his uncle are very close. Koperu shares about his life and his uncle gives him support and advice. His uncle also documents and comments on these interactions in a diary, with the intent to eventually give the diary to Koperu. The diary writing, which is interspersed with the narrative, provides insight into the ethical and emotional trials that Koperu shared with his uncle. The diary entries, which cover themes such as "view of things", "structure of society", "relation", etc. are in the style of a note written to Koperu.

In the end, Koperu writes a decision on his future way of living as a reply to his uncle, and the novel ends with the narrator asking the question "how do you live?" to the reader.

 Characters 
Koperu – A 15-year-old boy who experiences the ups and downs of school life, friendships, and finding his place in the world.

 Publication 
This book is one of the "Nihon Shosan Bunko" series that intended to convey knowledge and ideas of free and progressive culture to school children in Japan. However, many of the works were discouraged by the rise of Japanese militarism in 1930s.

Political scientist Masao Maruyama praised the composition that a child, Koperu, observes the reality and draws the process of drawing naturally the process of discovering various things, and complements the discovery of the main character in the form of a letter from my uncle are doing. Moreover, the question "How will you live" which is also the title of this book is not only the ethical problem of "How to live", but also what kind of social scientific awareness will live. It is evaluating that the problem of being presented is presented.

Author Yoshino Genzaburō, How Do You Live? was not originally conceived as a literary work, but was intended as a book on ethics. However, according to Takada Riko, this book is also a liberal art theory written for students of former junior high school during the height of culturalism. Takada focused on the privileged family environment and the high "social class" of the heroes. Those were drawn by the author, who was inspired by the people during his time at Takashi Associated Junior High School (now a high school attached to the University of Tsukuba). He pointed out that this book is meant to call out to the person, a human being capable of a self-living way (that is, educated) was then a limited number of privileged boys at the time.

 Format 
The story alternates viewpoint and storytelling between Koperu and his uncle. Koperu narrates his life in school as he goes through the life as a school child. His uncle narrates his experiences to help his nephew deal with bullying and struggles.

 Themes 
Koperu deals with the struggles of growing up as a human being. Much of the aspect of growing up involves dealing with people who are in opposition to the person, bullying, and philosophy.

 Adaptations 

 Manga 
In 2017, the book was serialized in manga form by Shoichi Haga and saw publication by Magazine House under the title How Do You Live? Cartoon Stories''.

Film 

Hayao Miyazaki and Studio Ghibli are currently in production of a film inspired by the novel. In the film, the original book by Yoshino will have significant meaning for the main character. Its production started in 2016, and will release on July 14, 2023.

References

Shinchosha books
1937 Japanese novels
Japanese novels adapted into films